Repenka is a rural locality (a selo) in Krasnogvardeysky District, Belgorod Oblast, Russia. The population was 209 as of 2010. There are 2 streets.

Geography 
Repenka is located 20 km north of Biryuch (the district's administrative centre) by road. Maryevka is the nearest rural locality.

References 

Rural localities in Krasnogvardeysky District, Belgorod Oblast